Francis Place (3 November 1771 in London – 1 January 1854 in London) was an English social reformer.

Early life
He was an illegitimate son of Simon Place and Mary Gray. His father was originally a journeyman baker. He then became a Marshalsea Court officer and ran a sponging-house in Vinegar Yard, Brydges Street, opposite the south side of the Theatre Royal, Drury Lane; Brydges Street is now named Catherine Street. Francis Place was born there on 3 November 1771, and baptised at St Martin-in-the-Fields, on 1 December 1771. His older sister, Hannah, had been born there on 17 April 1770. Not long after he was born, Francis, his parents, and older sister, moved to a house in Ship and Anchor Court, near Temple Bar, London. His younger brother named George, was born there in August 1773 and a younger sister Ann was born there in June 1775. In June 1780, Simon Place became a publican and moved his family to the Kings Arms, in Arundel Street, in the Strand.

Francis was schooled until 1785. On 20 June 1785, he was apprenticed to Joseph France, a leather-breeches maker in Temple Bar.

Father involved in a suit
In Place's autobiography, he stated that his mother's maiden surname was Gray but he did not know where his parents had met, or when they married. From his mother's recollection to Francis, he was told that she had married Simon at aged 25, which Place presumed was in 1755 or 1756. But no record appears to have been found of a marriage between the couple.

At around the time that Francis Place was apprenticed, his father was involved in a suit in the ecclesiastical court in the parish of St Clement Danes: A lady named Anna Place, had come to the Overseers and claimed parish aid, as the wife of Simon Place of Arundel Street. She had a daughter named Mary, who was then the wife of Henry Kitchin of Clerkenwell. The Parish Officers advised Simon to make a small weekly allowance for Anna, because they did not want the matter to become public but Simon refused, saying he would have nothing to do with her, and that Anna was not and never had been, his wife. So an action commenced in the ecclesiastical court. Anna claimed that she was the wife of Simon from a Fleet marriage which had occurred around forty years prior to this. This case lasted for around three years, according to Place's autobiography. It resulted in his father losing the case, and cost Simon several hundreds of pounds to defend himself. Simon Place (with his surname written as "Plaise" in the original register) had married Anna Peters at Fleet Prison, on 29 October 1747. This was only four days after Mary Place, daughter of Simon, was baptised at St Anne's Church, Soho. Mary Place married Henry Kitchin at St Pancras Old Church, on 30 January 1768.

Career
At eighteen, Place was an independent journeyman. On 7 March 1791, he was married to Elizabeth Chad at St Mary's Church, Lambeth. At the time of marriage, Francis was nineteen years old, and his bride was three weeks short of her seventeenth birthday. They moved to a house near the Strand.

In 1793 he became involved in and eventually the leader of a strike of leather-breeches makers, and was refused work for several years by London's master tailors; he exploited this time by reading avidly and widely. In 1794, Place joined the London Corresponding Society, a reform club, and for three years was prominent in its work, before resigning his post as chairman of the general committee in 1797 in protest at the violent tactics and rhetoric of some group members. In 1799 he became the partner in a tailor's shop, and a year later set up his own successful business at 16 Charing Cross.

Energetic radical

Withdrawing from politics whilst he established his business, he devoted three hours an evening after work to studying, eventually establishing such a large personal library in the back of his shop that it soon became a meeting place for radicals. In 1807 he supported Sir Francis Burdett, 5th Baronet, a Parliamentary candidate for Westminster, which allowed him to come into contact with such theorists as William Godwin, James Mill, Robert Owen, Jeremy Bentham, Joseph Hume and John Stuart Mill. When Place retired in 1817 (with a steady stream of income from his shop, now run by his children), he lived for several months with Bentham and the Mills at Forde Abbey.

It was around that time that he became involved in the movement for organised public education, which he believed to be a means of eradicating the ills of the working class. In the early 1820s, he also became a Malthusian and believed that as the population increased would outstrip the food supply. Place successfully associated Malthus with the idea of birth control, which Malthus himself had opposed despite his fears of overpopulation. Despite himself having fathered 15 children, Placeadvocated the use of contraception butwas not specific about in what forms. It was on this topic that he wrote his only published book, the influential and controversial Illustrations and Proofs of the Principles of Population, in 1822.

Place also lobbied successfully for the 1824 repeal of the Combination Act, which helped early trade unionism, but new restrictions were soon introduced. Place himself regarded trade unionism as a delusion that workers would soon forget about if they were allowed to try it.

In 1827, he entered a long period of depression after the death of his wife from cancer. On 13 February 1830, in Kensington, he married Louisa Chatterley, a London actress. Also in this year, Place helped support Rowland Detrosier, a working class radical activist who also sought to distance himself from socialism. Through Place, Detrosier would be introduced to figures such as Bentham and J.S. Mill, who in turn introduced him to Thomas Carlyle. Detrosier's activities and writings would be influential amongst Manchester Radicals and the later Chartists. He was also active in the agitation that led to the Reform Act of 1832, holding up the recent revolution in Paris as an example of what could happen if reform was not allowed by legal means.

Moral-force Chartist and old age 

Having lost much of his money in 1833 in bad investments, Place had to move from Charing Cross to Brompton Square, and lost his regular contact with the Reformist middle-class. However, he remained politically active, working against the stamp tax and involving himself in the London Working Men's Association, within which in 1838 he and William Lovett drafted the document that would become the People's Charter. It then became evident that many Chartists were willing to use violent means, and when Feargus O'Connor replaced Lovett as the effective leader of the movement, Place ceased to be involved in Chartist activities. On rescinding his involvement with the Chartists, he became involved in the movement to repeal the Corn Laws.

For the next two decades he wrote his autobiography and organised the immense collection he had made: notes, pamphlets, newspapers and letters. He separated from his wife in 1851. Francis then went to live in Hammersmith for two years with his daughter Annie, the wife of John Miers, and their family. He then brought a house at 6, Foxley Terrace, Earls Court, Kensington, and lived there with his two unmarried daughters, Mary and Jane. Francis Place died at this address on the morning of 1 January 1854. He was buried on 7 January 1854, at Brompton Cemetery.

Memorials

Place is listed on the Reformers' Memorial in Kensal Green Cemetery in London.

Legacy
His pamphlets, letters, magazine and newspaper articles throw light on the social and economic history of the nineteenth century. His hoarding of documents create an important archive. The British Library currently holds these documents in fifty-four reels of micro-film as the Francis Place Collection.

See also
National Political Union (England)

Notes

Bibliography
 Place, Francis [1822] Illustrations and Proofs of the Principles of Population, a new edition with introduction and critical and textual notes by Norman E. Himes, London, Geo. Allen and Unwin (1930)
 Thomas, W. (2006) "Place, Francis (1771–1854)", Oxford Dictionary of National Biography, Oxford University Press, online edn, accessed 11 Aug 2007 (subscription required)
 
 Miles, Dudley. (1988) Francis Place (1771–1854): The Life of a Remarkable Radical, Brighton, UK: Harvester Press. .

External links

Wallas, Graham The life of Francis Place, 1771–1854, 1894, London, New York: Longmans, Green, from the Internet Archive
Guide to Place, Francis. Papers, 1830–1832. 5421mf. Kheel Center for Labor-Management Documentation and Archives, Martin P. Catherwood Library, Cornell University.

1771 births
1854 deaths
British birth control activists
Chartists
English trade unionists
19th-century English non-fiction writers
British social reformers
English social commentators
English reformers
English economists